Richlord "Richie" Ennin (born September 17, 1998) is a Canadian professional soccer player who plays as a forward for Hungarian club Budapest Honvéd, on loan from Latvian club Spartaks Jūrmala.

Club career

Toronto FC
In 2015, Ennin played with Toronto FC III in League1 Ontario, scoring 7 goals. In 2016, he appeared for Toronto FC III in both League1 Ontario, scoring five goals in 10 appearances, and the Premier Development League, scoring once in 13 appearances. Ennin made a single appearance for Toronto FC II during the 2015 USL season, having been called up while a prominent figure in the TFC Academy. He made his debut in a 2-0 defeat to Rochester Rhinos on September 24, 2015. Ennin remained with affiliate side Toronto FC II on loan from the Academy for the 2016 USL season.

Italy
In November 2017, Ennin transferred to Serie D club Isola Capo Rizzuto.

In August 2018, Ennin would transfer to Serie D club Castrovillari.

Spartaks Jūrmala
In 2019, Ennin joined Latvian Higher League side Spartaks Jūrmala. That season, he made 22 league appearances, scoring five goals and assisting on eight more.

Loans
On 16 January 2020, Ennin would be loaned to Lithuanian A Lyga side FK Žalgiris.

In October 2020, Ennin would join FNL club FC Tom Tomsk on a subloan from Žalgiris, until the end of 2020. Ennin would be voted by supporters as the club's best player in November and December, and his loan with Tom Tomsk would be extended until June 2021.

In August 2021, Ennin would join Russian Premier League club Nizhny Novgorod on loan for the 2021–22 season. He reunited with Aleksandr Kerzhakov, who was his manager at Tom Tomsk in the previous season. On 23 June 2022, Nizhny Novgorod confirmed that Ennin left the club upon the expiry of his loan.

In July 2022, he joined Budapest Honvéd of the in the Hungarian Nemzeti Bajnokság I on loan, with an option to purchase.

International career
Ennin made his international debut while representing Canada at the CONCACAF Under-17 Championship. One of nine Toronto FC Academy players to be included in the squad, the striker first featured in a 1–1 draw with Mexico on March 6, 2015. He made a second appearance three days later during a 3–1 win over Saint Lucia.

Career statistics

References

External links

1998 births
Soccer players from Toronto
Living people
Association football defenders
Canadian soccer players
Canada men's youth international soccer players
Toronto FC II players
Toronto FC players
U.S. Castrovillari Calcio players
FK Spartaks Jūrmala players
FK Žalgiris players
FC Tom Tomsk players
FC Nizhny Novgorod (2015) players
Budapest Honvéd FC players
League1 Ontario players
USL Championship players
Serie D players
Latvian Higher League players
A Lyga players
Russian Premier League players
Nemzeti Bajnokság I players
Canadian expatriate soccer players
Expatriate footballers in Italy
Canadian expatriate sportspeople in Italy
Expatriate footballers in Latvia
Canadian expatriate sportspeople in Latvia
Expatriate footballers in Lithuania
Canadian expatriate sportspeople in Lithuania
Expatriate footballers in Russia
Canadian expatriate sportspeople in Russia
Expatriate footballers in Hungary
Canadian expatriate sportspeople in Hungary